Laderman may refer to:

Carol Laderman (1932–2010), American anthropologist
Ezra Laderman (1924–2015), American composer of classical music
Fred "Ladd" Laderman (1927–2021), American television and film writer and producer
Gabriel Laderman (1929–2011), American figurative painter
Mierle Laderman Ukeles (born 1939), American artist known for her feminist and service-oriented work